The 2020 Eifel Grand Prix (officially known as the Formula 1 Aramco Großer Preis der Eifel 2020) was a Formula One motor race held on 11 October 2020 at the Nürburgring in Nürburg, Germany on the  GP-Strecke layout. It was the first Formula One race held at the Nürburgring since 2013. The race was the eleventh round of the 2020 Formula One World Championship and the first running in history of the Eifel Grand Prix. The race was won by Lewis Hamilton from second on the grid. With the win, he equalled Michael Schumacher's record for most Grand Prix wins.

Background

Impact of the COVID-19 pandemic 

The 2020 championship was heavily affected by the COVID-19 pandemic. Most of the originally planned Grands Prix were cancelled or postponed, prompting the Fédération Internationale de l'Automobile to draft a new calendar. This was the first time since the 2013 German Grand Prix that the GP-Strecke layout hosted a Formula One Grand Prix. Up to 20,000 fans were expected to attend the race with social distancing measures in place.

Entrants 

The drivers and teams were initially the same as the season entry list. Ferrari Driver Academy drivers Mick Schumacher and Callum Ilott were entered to appear in the first practice session, driving for Alfa Romeo Racing in place of Antonio Giovinazzi and for Haas in place of Romain Grosjean, respectively. The first practice session was ultimately cancelled, meaning that Schumacher and Ilott were unable to participate (they would eventually make their free practice debuts separately, with Schumacher making his debut at the 2020 Abu Dhabi Grand Prix for Haas, and Ilott would make his debut at the 2021 Portuguese Grand Prix for Alfa Romeo Racing). Nico Hülkenberg replaced Lance Stroll, as he felt unwell before the third practice session and tested positive for the coronavirus on the day of the race. Hülkenberg would not return until the 2022 Bahrain Grand Prix as a substitute for a similarly coronavirus stricken Sebastian Vettel.

Tyres 

Pirelli supplied their C2, C3, and C4 compound tyres for teams to use in the race, the middle range of compounds available in terms of hardness.

Practice 
The first practice session on Friday began at 11:00 CEST (UTC+2). However, rain and fog prevented the cars from leaving the pit lane as conditions were unsafe for the medical helicopter to fly. With 30 minutes of the session left to go, first practice was abandoned, and no running was completed. The second practice session was due to start at 15:00 CEST on Friday, but was likewise cancelled. Mercedes driver Valtteri Bottas was fastest in third practice ahead of teammate Lewis Hamilton and Ferrari driver Charles Leclerc. Racing Point driver Lance Stroll sat out the session due to COVID-19, and later withdrew from the rest of the weekend. Stroll had previously tested negative and would not test positive until the Monday after the race.

Qualifying

Qualifying classification

Race

Race report 
At the race start, Valtteri Bottas, who had started on pole position, and Mercedes teammate Lewis Hamilton battled for the lead after Hamilton produced a better start, with Bottas maintaining his position. Renault's Daniel Ricciardo passed Red Bull's Alexander Albon for fifth place, and Ricciardo's teammate Esteban Ocon fell back from seventh to ninth. On lap eight Albon became the first driver to make a pit stop, switching from the soft to the medium-compound tyres. On the following lap, Ricciardo overtook the Ferrari of Charles Leclerc at turn two for fourth place. On lap 11, Ferrari's Sebastian Vettel, running in 10th place, spun at turn one during an overtake attempt on the Alfa Romeo of Antonio Giovinazzi. He returned to the track but the spin dropped him to 13th.

On lap 13, race leader Bottas locked up his brakes and ran wide at turn one, allowing Hamilton to pass him at turn two. Bottas entered the pits for a tyre change at the end of the lap. On the same lap, Alfa Romeo's Kimi Räikkönen attempted an overtake on the 19th-placed Williams of George Russell at turn one, but understeered into the side of Russell. This caused a puncture and suspension damage for Russell, who was forced to pull over to the side of the track at the exit of turn six and retire from the race. Räikkönen was later issued a 10-second time penalty for causing the collision, which he served during his pit stop. The virtual safety car (VSC) was deployed whilst Russell's car was recovered. Hamilton was able to extend his advantage over Bottas by making his pit stop during the VSC period, as was Red Bull's Max Verstappen, who retained second place after pitting. The VSC period ended on lap 17. AlphaTauri's Daniil Kvyat locked up his brakes and went straight on at the turn 13–14 chicane, allowing Albon to pass him for 10th place; however, Albon made contact with Kvyat's front wing whilst completing the overtake, breaking it off and forcing Kvyat to complete a full lap without it before returning to the pits. Shortly afterwards, third-placed Bottas complained of power loss and fell to seventh place before entering the pits to retire from the race.

Ocon entered the pits at the end of lap 22 to retire with a hydraulics issue. On the following lap, Albon was issued a five-second time penalty for causing the collision with Kvyat but came into the pits and retired his car due to a damaged radiator. McLaren's Lando Norris began to report power loss on lap 26. Leclerc passed the AlphaTauri of Pierre Gasly for seventh place on lap 28, and was later promoted to fourth after cars ahead made their pit stops. He then battled with Racing Point's Sergio Pérez on lap 33, losing fourth place, regaining it on the following lap and then dropping to fifth again on lap 35. At this point, drivers began to make their second pit stops, with Williams' Nicholas Latifi being the first, followed by Haas' Kevin Magnussen, Leclerc, Giovinazzi, and Vettel. Norris, who was running in sixth place, suffered total power unit failure on lap 44 and pulled over to the side of the track after turn six. The safety car was deployed and those drivers who had not yet made a second pit stop did so, with the exception of Haas' Romain Grosjean who was promoted to seventh place. The order of the top 10 was now Hamilton, Verstappen, Ricciardo, Pérez, Sainz, Leclerc, Grosjean, Gasly, Nico Hülkenberg, and Giovinazzi. The safety car remained out until lap 50 to allow lapped cars to pass. Grosjean quickly fell to 9th place after the restart, and Gasly passed Leclerc for sixth place on the following lap.

Hamilton crossed the finish line to take his 91st race win, equalling seven-time world champion Michael Schumacher's record for most Grand Prix wins. The race left Hamilton leading the drivers' championship on 230 points with teammate Bottas second on 161 and Verstappen third on 147. Räikkönen broke the record for most race starts with 323, held by Rubens Barrichello since the 2008 Monaco Grand Prix. Ricciardo became the first Renault driver to finish on the podium since Nick Heidfeld at the 2011 Malaysian Grand Prix; it was also his first podium since he won the 2018 Monaco Grand Prix. His career's final points finish, Grosjean scored a 9th-place finish for Haas.

During the post-race interviews, Mick Schumacher gave Hamilton his father's race-worn Mercedes helmet from 2012 as a reward from the Schumacher family for equalling the number of wins. Both Hamilton and Verstappen complained about the length of the safety car period, arguing that it was unnecessarily too long. After the race, Masi said: "There's a requirement in the sporting regulations to wave all the lapped cars past". The following year, during the closing stages of the controversial 2021 Abu Dhabi Grand Prix, Masi would contradict himself when permitting only the 5 cars between race leader Lewis Hamilton and Max Verstappen to unlap themselves.

Race classification 

Notes
  – Includes one point for fastest lap.
  – Alexander Albon received a five-second time penalty for causing a collision with Daniil Kvyat, but it was unapplied as he retired from the race.

Championship standings after the race 

Drivers' Championship standings

Constructors' Championship standings

 
 Note: Only the top five positions are included for both sets of standings.

Notes

References

External links 

Eifel Grand Prix
Eifel
Eifel Grand Prix